The greater weever (Trachinus draco, Linnaeus 1758) is a benthic and demersal venomous marine fish of the family Trachinidae. The greater weever is widely distributed along the eastern Atlantic coastline from Norway to Morocco, extending to the Mediterranean, Aegean and Black Seas.
Trachinus draco has been shown to occur in depths ranging from shallow water up to -150 meters where it inhabits mostly muddy or sandy grounds.
Trachinus draco is mostly and notoriously known for its venomous spines that can inflict serious injuries on humans through accidental stinging. Because of these spines and its potent venom it is classified as one of the most venomous fishes in the Mediterranean.⁠
The name “weever” is thought to originate from the Anglo-Saxon word “wivre” which translates as “viper”.

Physical appearance 
Trachinus draco is an elongated and laterally flattened fish with upstanding eyes and a distinct superior mouth that is inclined upwards. The lower jaw is longer than the upper jaw. The head is compact flat and relatively big and the eyes sit almost on top of it.⁠ The upper rim of the eye has two to three small spines, in front of each eye. The five to seven spiny fin rays on its first dorsal fin and the thorns on each of the gill covers have venom glands at their basis.⁠

Colouration 
On its dorsal side Trachinus draco is coloured in an greenish brown with a varying count of dark marks on the upper side of the head. The flank is hued in a yellowish brown with bright blue and yellow discontinuous stripes that run crooked to the front of the fish.⁠
Additionally oblique black stripes can be found laterally. This pattern is described as tiger-like by Horst Müller.⁠

Body dimensions 
The body dimensions of Trachinus draco are described very differently by different authors and seem to differ based on the geographical location were the study has been carried out.
In the Eastern Black Sea, the length distribution of mature fishes ranges from 10 cm up to a maximum of 25.8 cm for females and from 9.5 cm to 22.5 cm for males. The weight ranges from 6.96 g to 131.76 g for females and from 5.34 g to 75.84 g for males.⁠
While the largest female recorded in the Eastern Black Sea was 25.8 cm long, the findings in other studies suggest, that Trachinus draco has a much bigger range in size than that found in this study. In the Algarve Coast of Southern Portugal the largest female found by Santos et al. had a total maximum length of 39.6 cm. But also in the Black Sea specimens have been observed, that outrange the largest female found by Ak & Genç in 2013. The largest female found by Ak et al. in the Black Sea had a total maximum length of 35 cm.⁠ For Ak & Genç it seems to be clear that many factors contribute to the varying size of Trachinus draco like “temperature, salinity, food (quantity, quality and size), sex, time of year and stage of maturity”.⁠

Ecology and behaviour

Diet and feeding behaviour 
Trachinus draco is a so-called ambush predator that digs itself into fine sand during daytime only with its eyes and the tip of the dorsal fin exposed.⁠ There it lurks until prey emerges which is then attacked by the predator in a swift and sudden manner.
During the night time the greater weever is believed to swim around freely, even pelagically. This thesis is indirectly supported by the finding, that prey in the stomach of T. draco which were caught during daytime was already mostly digested. Subsequent the feeding activity of T. draco seems to be higher during night time.⁠⁠⁠ ⁠
T. draco is a carnivore that mainly feeds on Decapods, Bonefish (Teleostei) and Opossum shrimps (Mysida) as catches in the eastern-central Adriatic Sea suggest. To a lower extent their diet contains also Isopoda, Amphipoda, Cephalopoda and Shells (Bivalvia).  In general the former make up to over 90% of the total Index of Relative Importance (IRI). The most common prey that could be identified to the rank of species, were decapods namely Liocarcinus depurator and Galathea strigosa and mysids namely Anchialina agilis. 
But the compounds of the diet altered significantly with fish size. While the relatively small mysids were the most common prey for T. draco specimens under a size of 20 cm, their importance in the diet composition decreased with size, as the importance of amphipods did, too. On the other hand, the share of cephalopods and fishes increased with fish size.
The feeding habit of T. draco in the eastern Adriatic Sea differs very little over the year and decapods have been the most common prey through all seasons but peaked through summer and autumn while teleostei consumption peaked in winter.⁠⁠
In Danish waters on the other hand Merlangius merlangus and to smaller extent clupeoides were the main feeding source in the time of winter.⁠
The frequency of empty stomachs, in the specimens found in the eastern Adriatic Sea was around 15% in general, but differed significantly through the year. In winter the frequency of empty stomachs was highest, with a maximum at around 43.3% and was lowest in summer with 6.8% and in autumn with 7.8%.⁠
These findings were somewhat similar to those in Danish waters. In Kattegat the amount of empty stomachs has been observed in the months of January to April and is described as “very high, close to 100% in some month”.⁠⁠⁠
Those findings may be due to the lower water temperature of around 12 to 13 °C and the therefore lowered metabolism and feeding activity respectively.⁠
Aquarium experiments with stable light, temperature, salinity and sustained food supply on the contrary suggest an endogenous feeding pattern because even under such conditions the fishes refused to eat in the time from January to April and from October to March.⁠

Reproduction and spawning behaviour 

The reproduction period of T. draco seems to lasts from June to October.⁠ This very broad range is limited by the observations of Ole Bagge (2004) who states that his findings strongly indicate that the spawning time of T. draco is indeed restricted to the period between June and August with a peak in July. Bagge also says that there have been no findings of greater weever in spawning condition from September to May.⁠
T. draco is an oviparous spawning fish that lays its eggs into the pelagic zone. ⁠The larvae have a size of about 4.8 mm to 6.8 mm ⁠ and hatch after approximately three months. The larvae and the eggs can both be found in the pelagic zone and the surface plankton. The larvae of T. draco may have a need for relatively warm water with a relatively low salinity to hatch in greater numbers.⁠⁠
T. draco is probably not territorial, even in the mating season. It has not been observed to carry out any form of parental care.

Toxicity

Venomous apparatus 
The venomous apparatus of T. draco consists of one spine on each operculum and five to eight dorsal spines. The spines on the operculum point towards the cauda, or tail, and are slightly bent downwards. The opercular spines arise from the upper edge of the operculum and are connected to the operculum with one third of their complete length. The other two thirds of their length lies free along the operculum. The total length of the opercular spines is approximately 27 mm. The spine itself is “covered by an integumentary sheath”.⁠⁠ If this sheath ruptures because there is force applied to the spine, it allows the venom to leak from the venom gland cells and to run through a deep groove along the spine and into the wound caused by the sting. 
Each of the dorsal spines is covered in an individual integumentary sheet. The spines are connected through a fine interspinous membrane. The spines have different length and are by that arranged in a curve like manner. The spines observed by Russel & Emery (1960) had minimum lengths of 5 mm and maximum lengths of 29 mm and were quite heterogeneous in their appearance on a microscopic level. The dorsal spines are all bent very slightly towards the tail of the fish. The mechanism of envenomation is quite similar to that of the opercular spines.⁠

Venom glands 
The glands producing T. draco’s venom are located in the derma of the fish. The venom glands are cased in connective tissue coated with a basal lamina which has a length of 0.1 μm. The venom glands are built up of polygonal cells with a long axis length of 40-50 μm.
These cells show a relatively heterogeneous cytoplasm with noticeable large vacuoles and heterogeneous granular (Verdiglione, Mammola, Gargano, & Montesi, 2003).
As in the tissue of the lesser weever  (Echiichthys vipera / Trachinus vipera) supporting cells can be found in T. draco which develop from epidermal cells. These supporting cells form pockets inside the venom glands which are filled with differentiated glandular cells. The supporting cells most probably play a role in the cohesiveness of the venom gland and in the regeneration of the glandular cells.

Toxin 
The potentially lethal protein component in the crude venom of T. draco is a 105 kDa polypeptide which is called Dracotoxin. The crude venom of T. draco has been shown to have membrane depolarizing and haemolytic characteristics. Those characteristics could be retraced to said single protein component. The depolarisation effect however could not be explained by well-established approaches. Neither does the depolarisation effect take place through Na+ or K+-channels nor through Na+-K+-ATPase activity.⁠
The weever sting is often followed by first ischemic and subsequently hyperemic effects in the tissue surrounding the sting. These effects might be related to the high concentrations of histamines and catecholamines found in the venom.⁠
⁠⁠While Church & Hodgson (2002) suggest a cholinesterase activity of the toxin itself, Haavaldsen & Fonnum (1963) interpreted their finding of a high concentration of cholinesterase in the venom as a sign for a cholinergic mechanism in the production of the venom because cholinesterase activity hasn't yet been described in the venoms of the animal kingdom.⁠ 
As Russel & Emery (1960) stated, the toxin extract of T. draco has a greyish colour but is clear in its appearance. It is said to have a “fishy taste” and “ammoniacal odor”. The pH value of the extract seems to be 6.78 and is with that slightly sour.⁠
The toxin of the closely related lesser weever T. vipera has been shown to contain 5-Hydroxy-Triptamine also called Serotonin but in the toxin of T. draco this finding could not be confirmed⁠.⁠
The toxicity of the venom was dependent on the way of extraction. The highest toxicity was measured in live fish which were shock frozen and laired in −70 °C-freezers. Under such conditions the minimal lethal dose for mice was 1.8 μg/g while at least 110 mg could be extracted from an average sized fish.⁠

Relationship with humans 
The most common incident regarding humans is strongly connected with T. draco’ s typical behaviour: being burrowed in the sand of shallow waters. Especially in the summer it is quite possible for a careless bather to step, jump or fall on the venomous spines of the greater weever. The other occasion where humans are at risk to get stung by T. draco is when fishermen are handling the fish if caught in a net.⁠⁠
⁠The venom of the greater weever is best-known for the excruciating pain it provokes a short period of time after the initial sting which can last from a few hours to days. There are in fact cases reported in which victims of a weever sting were still affected by it after a period of 4 months, even if this seems to be a rare scenario. The pain can in some cases reach up to a 10/10 on the numeric rating scale. In a reported case from 1782, a fisherman who had been stung, amputated his own finger to relieve the pain.⁠⁠
Even if there are reported cases of fatal accidents with T. draco, it is widely believed that those are due to secondary infections and sepsis rather than to the toxin itself.⁠

Treatment 
There are as many recommended treatments for a sting of the greater weever as there are fishermen who were stung by them. These recommendations reach from the application of hot water or vinegar to more arcane methods like fish liver, tobacco juice or the suggestion of “burning the devilish weever, swear and pray”.⁠
The modern medicine does in fact recommend the application of any kind of heat preferably to souse the affected limb into hot water (40-42 °C). Beside this first aid attempt to ease the pain it is recommended to clean the wound and to see a physician because antibiotics, further analgesics or even a tetanus prophylaxis might be appropriate.⁠

Commercial use 
Although the greater weever is sold commercially in France, where it is seen as a delicacy, it is often caught as by-catch.⁠  ⁠
If caught together with other by-catch fish it is often sold on markets in the category of mixed fish also called “morralla” or at least this is considered a practice in some parts of the Mediterranean.⁠

References

External links 

 UKonline 
 Fishbase
 Simpler info
 UK Fishing species 
 Mike Ladle's Fishing diary
 Marine life 
 Species
 

greater weever
Fish of the Mediterranean Sea
Fish of the Black Sea
Fish of the North Sea
Fish of the Baltic Sea
Marine fish of Europe
Marine fauna of North Africa
Fauna of the Canary Islands
greater weever
Taxa named by Carl Linnaeus